The Queanbeyan Observer was an English language newspaper published from 1884 until 1915 in Queanbeyan, New South Wales, Australia by John Gale.

History 
The Queanbeyan Observer has had various name changes over the years including through mergers. Beginning publication in 1884 it merged with The Queanbeyan Age in 1915. Its new title was The Queanbeyan Age and the Queanbeyan Observer and it was published from 15 April 1915 until 1 April 1927. Then in 1927 it merged with the Queanbeyan Canberra Advocate to become The Queanbeyan Age Canberra Advocate, which was published from 5 April 1927. Its final issue was 22 July the same year.

Digitisation 
The Queanbeyan Observer has been digitised as part of the Australian Newspapers Digitisation Program of the National Library of Australia.

See also 
 The Queanbeyan Age
 List of newspapers in New South Wales
 List of newspapers in Australia

References

External links 
 
 

Defunct newspapers published in New South Wales
Queanbeyan
1884 establishments in Australia
1927 disestablishments in Australia